Sebastian Kóša (born 13 September 2003) is a Slovak footballer who plays for Spartak Trnava as a centre back.

Club career

FC Nitra
Kóša made his professional Fortuna Liga debut for Nitra against ViOn Zlaté Moravce on 13 June 2020.

International career
In December 2022, Kóša was nominated by Francesco Calzona, who joined the side in late summer, for Slovak national team prospective players' training camp at NTC Senec.

Recognitions

Personal
Kóša was named the Best Player of Slovakia in the U19 category in February 2022 at Grassroots Football Gala hosted by the SFZ.

Club
Spartak Trnava
Slovnaft Cup: 2021–22

References

External links
 FC Nitra official club profile 
 Futbalnet profile 
 
 

2003 births
Living people
People from Nové Zámky
Sportspeople from the Nitra Region
Slovak footballers
Slovakia youth international footballers
Slovakia under-21 international footballers
Association football defenders
FC Nitra players
FC Spartak Trnava players
Slovak Super Liga players